Alexandru Tofan (born 19 August 1987) is a Moldovan footballer who plays as a midfielder.

References

External links
 
 

1987 births
Footballers from Chișinău
Moldovan footballers
Living people
Association football midfielders
Moldovan Super Liga players
FC Iskra-Stal players
FC Rapid Ghidighici players
FC Dinamo-Auto Tiraspol players
FC Sfîntul Gheorghe players
CSF Bălți players